The following buildings were added to the National Register of Historic Places as part of the Archeological Resources of the Caloosahatchee Region Multiple Property Submission (or MPS).

References

 Lee
National Register of Historic Places Multiple Property Submissions in Florida